The folding carton created the packaging industry as it is known today, beginning in the late 19th century. The process involves folding carton made of paperboard that is printed, laminated, cut, then folded and glued. The cartons are shipped flat to a packager, which has its own machinery to fold the carton into its final shape as a container for a product. An example of such a carton is a cereal box.

Some styles of folding cartons can be made of E-flute or micro-flute corrugated fiberboard.

Invention and development
In the 1840s, cartons were made by hand and held together with tacks and string, and used only for expensive items (such as jewellery). Although Charles Henry Foyle is described by some as the "inventor" of the paper carton, mass production of the cartons was invented, partly by accident, at the Robert Gair Company in Brooklyn, New York. Machinery at the end of the press had been set up carelessly by a pressman, and machinery cut through the material. This ruined the press but gave them an idea: printing and cutting could be done with one machine. Previously, cutting of printed cardboard had been done manually. From the mistake in 1879, Gair developed a process for mass production of boxes. In 1897, the National Biscuit Company (Nabisco) became the first large company to adopt the new cartons, for Uneeda Biscuits. Other manufacturers soon followed. With inexpensive packaging now even common items could be placed in a showy carton and each carton became its own advertisement. The product was also protected, and the contents had a longer shelf life. This trend was to continue with force, through the 20th century. This could be seen as a contributing factor in the so-called 'throwaway' culture of America. The environmental impact of product packaging has gained attention from consumers and businesses alike, and this awareness has created a steady trend since the mid to late 1990s, on the part of manufacturers, to use recycled material and/or reduce overall materials usage.

Product characteristics
Folding cartons are now an $110 billion industry. Typically, cylinder board made from pulp from reprocessed scrap paper is used for most packages. Cartons for food are made from a higher grade and lighter solid sulfate board with plastic coating. Because of the limitations of cutting machinery, the thickness of the board is limited to 0.81 mm (0.032 in), and folding cartons are generally limited to holding a few pounds or kilograms of material.

For example a typical breakfast cereal box has a poor material to volume ratio and is very inefficient; it is wasteful and can be considered overpackaging. Package designers  are aware of this opportunity to save packaging costs, materials, and waste but marketing and merchandising people want the “billboard” style package for advertising and graphics. An optimized folding carton would use much less paperboard for the same volume of cereal, but with reduced room for graphics.

Opening
Opening a carton can be accomplished by opening an access flap, cutting, use of tear tapes or perforations.

See also
Cartoning machine
Digifold
Oyster pail
Tetra Pak
Elopak

References

 Hanlon, Kelsey, and Forcinio; Handbook of Package Engineering (CRC Press, 1998)
 Soroka, W, "Fundamentals of Packaging Technology", IoPP, 2002, 
 Yam, K. L., "Encyclopedia of Packaging Technology", John Wiley & Sons, 2009, 

Containers
Paperboard packaging
19th-century inventions